Scottish Drapery Corporation was a holding company for a group of Scottish department stores and drapers.

History
In 1926 the Scottish Drapery Corporartion was created to take over the share capital of several Scottish businesses. They were Pettigrew & Stephens a department store in Glasgow; Patrick Thomson Ltd a department store in Edinburgh; D M Brown Ltd a drapers in Dundee and Watt & Grant Ltd a drapers in Aberdeen. The idea was to increase the buying power and financial resources of the businesses, and were run by John Campbell, who had worked his way up through Pettigrew & Stephens.

The business continued to grow by purchasing a raft of business between 1928 and 1950. These were:

1928 - J & R Allan Ltd a silk mercers and drapers in Edinburgh
1929 - John Falconer & Co Ltd a drapers in Aberdeen
1934 - Daly & Sons a department store in Glasgow
1936 - J D Blair & Sons Ltd a drapers in Edinburgh
1938 - Cochranes Stores Ltd a  ladies outfitters in Edinburgh (was incorporated into J D Blair & Sons)
1946 - J & S Shannon Ltd a yacht outfitters in Greenock
1949 - Reid & Pearson Ltd a drapers in Aberdeen
1950 - A & R Milne a drapers in Aberdeen

In 1952, House of Fraser purchased the Scottish Drapery Corporation (which two thirds of the shares were then held by Debenhams) merging the individually run businesses into the House of Fraser group. To fund the purchase of the Corporation, House of Fraser sold all bar the two department stores property to Legal & General and leased them back at favourable rates.

After the House of Fraser takeover, D M Brown continued to trade under this name until 1972 when it became Arnotts. This closed in 2002
and Reid & Pearson closed in 1960s. J & R Allen was converted into an Arnots during the 1970s but subsequently closed.

References

1926 establishments in Scotland
Holding companies established in 1926
Defunct department stores of the United Kingdom
Holding companies of the United Kingdom
House of Fraser
Retail companies of Scotland
Holding companies disestablished in 1952
1952 disestablishments in Scotland
British companies disestablished in 1952
1952 mergers and acquisitions